Émile Edmond Gustave Barbier (born 1902, date of death unknown) was a Belgian fencer. He competed in the team épée event at the 1928 Summer Olympics. Two years later, at the 1930 World Fencing Championships, Barbier won a gold medal.

References

External links
 

1902 births
Year of death missing
Belgian male fencers
Olympic fencers of Belgium
Fencers at the 1928 Summer Olympics
Sportspeople from Brussels